Kim Jeffrey Kurniawan (born 23 March 1990) is a professional footballer who plays as a midfielder for Liga 1 club PSS Sleman. Born in Germany, he represented Indonesia at international level.

Personal life
Kim Kurniawan was born in Germany to a German mother and an Indonesian father who has Chinese lineage. His paternal grandfather, Kwee Hong Sing, was an Indonesian footballer who played for Persija Jakarta and the Indonesia national team in the 1950s.

Born with German nationality, Kurniawan decided to take up Indonesian citizenship after the PSSI, the football association of Indonesia, offered him a naturalization path that could pave way for him to win a position on the national team. In December 2010, he officially received an Indonesian passport and, after Cristian Gonzáles, became the second naturalized football player in that country; Gonzáles had done so in November 2010. Kurniawan's sister, Jennifer Kurniawan, is married to Irfan Bachdim, an Indonesian football player who was born and bred in the Netherlands. Bachdim and Kurniawan, who are both playing for PSS Sleman, came to Indonesia at the same time in 2010 and became teammates at Persema Malang in 2011.

Early career

Karlsruher SC
After training at a soccer school in Karlsruhe, Kurniawan, then age 6, was recruited by German club Karlsruher SC when it was still playing in the top-flight Bundesliga. He stayed there for 12 years, participating in youth games against international clubs such as Inter Milan, FC Valencia and other German clubs like Bayern Munich, Borussia Dortmund, Schalke 04 and Bayer 04 Leverkusen. However, Kurniawan suffered a knee injury at 18 in his last junior season, ruining his dream to play high-level professional football in Germany.

Club career

FC 07 Heidelsheim
His knee injury kept him away from the ball for the better part of a year. Eventually, Kurniawan joined FC 07 Heidelsheim which played in the Verbandsliga, tier-six of German football, at the time. He enjoyed a successful first season, playing in every game while scoring two goals. He had agreed to extend his contract but this changed after he received an invitation to play in Indonesia with a possibility to play for the national team of his father's country.

Persema Malang
Kurniawan went to Indonesia in 2010 with two other Europe-based footballers of Indonesian descent, Irfan Bachdim and Alessandro Trabucco. His career there started with an invitation to charity games in East Java cities of Surabaya and Malang in 2010. After the matches,  Timo Scheunemann, a German who was coaching top-flight team Persema Malang contacted Kurniawan and offered him a trial, in which the latter impressed.
Scheunemann recruited Kurniawan and Bachdim to play in the 2011 season of the breakaway Indonesian Premier League, irking the PSSI that later delayed Kurniawan's naturalization process. Without an Indonesian passport at the time, Kurniawan could not play as local player until he officially became Indonesian. An injury also kept him from playing on the national team for the Suzuki AFF Cup 2010. Despite the challenges, Kurniawan signed a contract with Persema Malang in 2011 and stayed for almost three years.

Amid Persema's financial problems in late 2013, Kurniawan tried to play in Thailand but did not secure a contract despite trials at several clubs.

Pelita Bandung Raya
The failure in Thailand led Kurniawan to look for opportunities in Indonesia again. Kurniawan in December 2013 signed up for Pelita Bandung Raya that played in Bandung, West Java in the Indonesia Super League. He played for two seasons there under Serbian coach Dejan Antonic until the club was sold in late 2015 after going through financial difficulties.

Persib Bandung
Kurniawan in early 2016 joined Persib Bandung after the top club in Bandung hired coach Antonic. During the FIFA one-year suspension on Indonesian football, Kurniawan was part of the Persib team that participated in unauthorized tournaments in his first season, including the 2016 Indonesia Soccer Championship A where the club finished fifth and the 2016 Bhayangkara Cup that saw the team went all the way to the final.

Kurniawan's second season saw his team finish 13th in the 2017 Liga 1, the first full-season of top-flight Indonesian football after FIFA lifted the suspension. Unfortunately, injuries affected his career again. He broke his fibula at the end of the season after being tackled by a Persija Jakarta player in the traditionally hostile Persija-Persib match. Kurniawan had to sit out most of the 2018 Liga 1. During recovery, Kurniawan developed an array of businesses in Bandung, ranging from a clothing line to a barbershop that has gained popularity among fans.

Kurniawan's undeterred will to come back from injury in late 2018 that led to a revived performance in the 2019 Liga 1 season, along with a number of goals, and his popular businesses won support from Persib fans who affectionately call him "Little Kimmy". Fans first thought he would retire in Bandung. However, Kurniawan shocked Persib loyalists when he decided to move in February 2021.

PSS Sleman
Kurniawan in early 2021, before the pre-season Piala Menpora tournament, decided to join PSS Sleman. His main reason was to reunite with coach Dejan Antonic and brother-in-law Irfan Bachdim, who both joined the up-and-coming Liga 1 club for the 2020 season that abruptly ended due to the COVID-19 pandemic.

International career
Kurniawan came to play in Indonesia in 2010 after injuries dashed any hope of getting called by his birth country Germany. Tempted by the possibility of representing his father's country, he took up the PSSI naturalization offer. In 2011, Kurniawan received the call from the Indonesia national under-23 team to play in the Southeast Asian Games 2011. He trained in several cities, including Hong Kong but did not break into the final squad.

In 2015, he was invited to the official FIFA friendly games against Cameroon and Myanmar.
During the match in Sidoarjo on 30 March 2015 against Myanmar, Kurniawan was brought on and made his debut for the senior team in a 2-1 win.

Honours 
PSS Sleman

 Menpora Cup third place: 2021

Individual
 Menpora Cup Best Eleven: 2021

Filmography 
 Tendangan dari Langit (2011)
 Aku Cinta Kamu (2014)

References

External links
 Kim Kurniawan official website
 Interview on career in English Football Indonesia podcast
 Kim Kurniawan at Soccerway
 

1990 births
Living people
People from Mühlacker
Sportspeople from Karlsruhe (region)
Indonesian footballers
Indonesia youth international footballers
Indonesia international footballers
Indonesian people of Chinese descent
Indonesian sportspeople of Chinese descent
German people of Chinese descent
German people of Indonesian descent
Indo people
Indonesian Christians
Naturalised citizens of Indonesia
Indonesian Premier League players
Liga 1 (Indonesia) players
Persema Malang players
Pelita Bandung Raya players
Persib Bandung players
PSS Sleman players
Association football midfielders